Rogue River Jr/Sr High School is a public high school located in Rogue River, Oregon, United States.

Academics
In 2008, 83% of the school's seniors received a high school diploma. Of 84 students, 70 graduated, six dropped out, and eight were still in high school the following year.

Athletics
Rogue River's high school athletic program began around the time the school did.  The mascot is the Chieftain and the team colors are forest green and gold.  Athletic teams are referred to as the "Chiefs" (boys) and "Lady Chiefs" (girls).  The athletic director is Jennifer Bakker.

The school is a member in good standing of the Oregon School Activities Association, and participates in the Southern Cascade League.  All teams currently play in Class 3A based on school enrollment.

Since 1931 there have been a total of 27 boys' state champions and 16 girls State Champions The girls at Rogue River, as well as most of the schools in the state, have only been competing in the state championship in track and field since 1968. The girls have also had four state record holders,  and were the first girls' team to win back-to-back state championships.

References

High schools in Jackson County, Oregon
Rogue River, Oregon
Public high schools in Oregon